The Green Domino (German: Der grüne Domino) is a 1935 German mystery drama film directed by Herbert Selpin and starring Brigitte Horney, Karl Ludwig Diehl and  Theodor Loos. It was shot at the Babelsberg Studios in Berlin and on location in Bavaria around Munich and the Tegernsee. The film's sets were designed by the art directors Otto Hunte and Willy Schiller. It is based on the novel Der Fall Claasen by Erich Ebermayer. A separate French-language version Le Domino vert was also produced, directed by Selpin and Henri Decoin but featuring a different cast.

Cast
 Brigitte Horney as Ellen Fehling / Marianne Fehling
 Karl Ludwig Diehl as Dr. Bruck
 Theodor Loos as Herr von Falck
 Margarete Schön as 	Frau von Falck
 Waldemar Leitgeb as 	Dr. Nohl
 Erika von Thellmann as 	Theres
 Erich Fiedler as 	Herr Fehling
 Eduard Wesener as 	Herr Pollnow
 Alice Treff as Lilly Bruck
 Hans Leibelt as Justizrat Lorenz
 Trude Hesterberg as Lulu Mielke
 Walther Jung	as Bildhauer Nebel
 Erwin Klietsch as 	Aloys
 Albert Hörrmann as 	Ellmos 
 Adolf Fischer as Maurer
 Ernst Waldow as 	Ansager
 Inka Adrian	
 Traute Bengen		
 Dorrit Merryll	
 Alfred Walter

References

Bibliography
 Hull, David Stewart. Film in the Third Reich: A Study of the German Cinema, 1933-1945. University of California Press, 1969.
 Rentschler, Eric. The Ministry of Illusion: Nazi Cinema and Its Afterlife. Harvard University Press, 1996.

External links 
 

1935 films
Films of Nazi Germany
German drama films
1935 drama films
1930s German-language films
German black-and-white films
1930s German films
Films directed by Herbert Selpin
Films shot at Babelsberg Studios
Films based on German novels
Films shot in Bavaria
UFA GmbH films

de:Der grüne Domino